Samuel Gray may refer to:

 Samuel Gray (Australian politician) (1823–1889), member of the New South Wales Legislative Assembly
 Samuel Gray (died 1770), American colonist, ropemaker, and among the first killed in the Boston Massacre
 Samuel Frederick Gray (1766–1828), British botanist, mycologist, and pharmacologist
 Samuel Brownlow Gray (1823–1910), barrister in the Bermudas

See also
Sam Gray (disambiguation)